Macroom GAA is a Gaelic football and hurling club based in the town and surrounding parish of Macroom in Cork, Ireland. The club is affiliated with Cork GAA county board and the Muskerry GAA divisional board. The club has been one of the most successful Gaelic football clubs in Cork having won the Cork Senior Football Championship ten times and having contributed numerous players to Cork GAA football teams.

Honours
 Cork Senior Football Championship Winners (10 titles) 1909, 1910, 1912, 1913, 1925, 1930, 1931, 1935, 1958, 1962 Runners-Up 1889, 1907, 1925, 1927, 1929, 1949 1955, 1959
 Cork Intermediate Football Championship Winners (3) 1982, 1990, 2010 Runners-Up 1916, 1919
 Cork Premier Intermediate Football Championship: Runners-Up 2013
 Cork Junior Football Championship Winners (1) 1907  Runners-Up 1900, 1905, 1906, 1909
 Cork Minor Football Championship Winners (8) 1928, 1929, 1930, 1935, 1946, 1948, 1949, 1986 Runners-Up 1927, 1934, 1936, 1942, 1947, 1964, 1969, 1970, 1971, 1972, 1977, 1985, 2005
 Cork Minor A Football Championship Winners (2) 1992, 2004 Runners-Up 2001
 Cork Under-21 Football Championship Winners (1) 1982  Runners-Up 1988, 1989, 2006, 2007
 Mid Cork Junior A Football Championship Winners (5) 1926, 1934, 1942, 1945, 1991  Runners-Up 1930, 1955

Inter-County Players
 Hugo Casey
 Tom Creedon
 Colman Corrigan
 Fintan Goold
 Noel Twomey

References

External links
Official Macroom Club website
 List of Cork Senior Football Champions 
 List of Cork Intermediate Football Champions
 Hogan Stand list of Cork Champions
 Cork GAA results archive page

Gaelic games clubs in County Cork
Gaelic football clubs in County Cork
Hurling clubs in County Cork
Macroom